The Undocupoets is a group of poets who are undocumented or support other undocumented poets. It began with three original poets, Marcelo Hernandez Castillo, Javier Zamora, and Christopher Soto aka Loma. The group united to petition against citizenship requirements in book prizes, but have grown to include a fellowship and more.

First book petition 
In 2015, the Undocupoets published a petition with the literary journal Apogee, with over 400 signatures from writers, readers, editors, and organizers. The point of this petition was to encourage major literary presses to remove the "proof of citizenship" requirement from their first book contests. The petition was focused on eleven press prizes including: Letras Latinas (Andres Montoya Poetry Prize), BOA Editions, the National Poetry Series, the Academy of American Poets, Persea Books, the Poetry Society of America, the Poetry Foundation, Sarabande Books, Crab Orchard Review, and Yale University Press. Many prizes ended up changing their requirements, including the National Poetry Series, who said, "What really persuaded us is the fact that we did share the desire to find the best poetry out there and help get it published, which is one of the hardest things to do.” In 2016, they were awarded the Barnes and Noble Writers for Writers Award for their work.

Fellowships and more 
After the success of their campaign, the Undocupoets expanded their mission to include a fellowship in partnership with Sibling Rivalry Press. In 2015, Southern Humanities Review created a feature on the Undocumented writers, inspired by the Undocupoets.

References

Poetry organizations
Immigrant rights activism